The 1969–70 season of the Lion Shield was the first season of top flight association football competition in Tonga. Kolofo'ou No.1
won the championship.

References

Tonga Major League seasons
Tonga
Football
Football